South Dakota Highway 130 (SD 130) is a  state highway in Walworth County, South Dakota, United States, that connects the city of Selby with the town of Java.

Route description
SD 130 begins at an intersection with the concurrent highways U.S. Route 12 (US 12), US 83, and SD 20 in Selby. It travels in a due eastward direction, with the exception of a northward curve around some railroad tracks through open fields for its entire length, and comes to an end at SD 271 in Java. It utilizes a portion of 130th Street for its path.

History
SD 130 was designated in 1976 as a redesignation of SD 103.

Major intersections

See also

 List of state highways in South Dakota

References

External links

 South Dakota Highways: Highway 130.

130
Highway 130